James D. Wilcox, ACE, is an American film and television editor and director. He is best known for his work on Thirteen Lives, Hillbilly Elegy, Genius, Roots, CSI: Miami and Everybody Hates Chris.

Life and career
James was born in Pittsburgh, Pennsylvania and studied mass communications broadcast management at Clark Atlanta University. He began his editing career in Atlanta, Georgia in 1982. As a producer, he won the Los Angeles Emmy Awards for KCBS-TV's Lip Sync in 1992. He has worked with directors like Ron Howard, James Cameron, Chris Columbus,  Tate Taylor, Mario Van Peebles and Damon Wayans.

James is an member of the peer group executive committee at the Academy of Television Arts and Sciences and a member of the diversity committee at the Motion Picture Editors Guild and the Directors Guild of America. Variety named him Artisan Elite in 2018.

Filmography

Awards and nominations

References

External links
 

Living people
American television editors
American film editors
Year of birth missing (living people)